Swami X (1925-2015) was an American boardwalk performer and stand-up comedian. Active from the 1970s to 1985, he performed in Los Angeles, San Francisco, Berkeley, and New York. He was known for bawdy sexual humor and political invective.

Swami X's act was a monologue mixing pithy sociopolitical observations with poetry, sarcasm and humor, which typically included blasphemy, profanity, and attacking "sacred cows"—producing "pleased shock and delighted outrage" in observers. His notable lines include:
"Sex is not the answer. Sex is the question. 'Yes' is the answer."
"How do we know Jesus Christ was Jewish?  Because he went into His Father's business."
"If I had known I would live this long, I would have taken better care of myself".
"You are what you eat.  If that's true, then I'm a nymphomaniac".

He was known for appearing on the Venice Boardwalk, at the UCLA and U.C. Berkeley campuses, in San Francisco, and at Washington Park in New York City. He retired in 1985. In 2009 the mayor of Los Angeles, Antonio Villaraigosa, presented him with an official proclamation.

Swami X appears as a character in Roger L. Simon's mystery novel, The Straight Man and is referenced in Pat Hartman's volume of Venice vignettes, Call Someplace Paradise.

Harry W. "Swami X" Hart died on August 29, 2015  at the home of former Los Angeles City Councilman Bill Rosendahl. He was 89, two and a half months before his 90th birthday. Hart was born in Philadelphia in mid-November 1925.

See also
Busking
List of well-known busking locations

References

Further reading
Jeffrey Stanton, Venice California: 'Coney Island of the Pacific'  (2005), page 273

Sweet William, 'X Swami X, The Sidewalk Comic', Los Angeles Times, Calendar Section, p. 170 (Dec. 23, 1979).

External links
Archive of blog postings by Swami X on the Free Venice Beachhead blog
Video of Los Angeles Mayor Villaraigosa presenting Swami X with official proclamation and recounting his experiences with Swami X at UCLA in the early 1970s 
Excerpts Video of SWAMI X Performing on the Venice Beach Boardwalk 1981, taken from "STREET LIFE" the documentary film by Mark S Shepherd
Brief article and recent photos of Swami X with quotations

American street performers
American male comedians
2015 deaths
1925 births